Pachycreadium is a genus of trematodes in the family Opecoelidae.

Species
Pachycreadium angolense Aleshkina & Gaevskaya, 1985
Pachycreadium carnosum (Rudolphi, 1819) Cortini & Ferretti, 1959
Pachycreadium gastrocotylum (Manter, 1940) Manter, 1954
Pachycreadium lerneri Sogandares-Bernal, 1959
Pachycreadium lethrini Hassanine, 2006

References

Opecoelidae
Plagiorchiida genera